The 1999 South African motorcycle Grand Prix was the fourteenth round of the 1999 Grand Prix motorcycle racing season. It took place on 10 October 1999 at Phakisa Freeway.

500 cc classification

250 cc classification

125 cc classification

Championship standings after the race (500cc)

Below are the standings for the top five riders and constructors after round fourteen has concluded.

Riders' Championship standings

Constructors' Championship standings

 Note: Only the top five positions are included for both sets of standings.

References

South African motorcycle Grand Prix
South Africa
Motorcycle Grand Prix
October 1999 sports events in Africa